Joaquim Pereira Pimenta de Castro, 10th Count of Pimenta de Castro (5 November 1846, in Pias, Monção – 14 May 1918, in Lisbon) was a Portuguese army officer and politician. He was a career military officer reaching the position of General, also graduated in mathematics by the University of Coimbra. In 1908, he was nominated commander of the 3rd Military Region, in Porto. After the proclamation of the Republic on 5 October 1910, he was Minister of War, for only two months, in 1911. He had to resign due to the monarchist incursion of Henrique de Paiva Couceiro. An independent, he was chosen by President Manuel de Arriaga to be the President of the Ministry (Prime Minister) of a government, who would rule without the parliament, where the Portuguese Republican Party, led by Afonso Costa had the majority. His government, with the support of the moderate Evolutionist Party and the Republican Union, and also conservative military factions, was in office from 28 January to 14 May 1915. It was overthrown by the military movement of 14 May 1915, supported by the Republican Party, which also caused  the resignation of President Manuel de Arriaga.

References

1846 births
1918 deaths
Naval ministers of Portugal
People from Monção
Prime Ministers of Portugal
Finance ministers of Portugal
Portuguese military officers
University of Coimbra alumni
19th-century Portuguese people